Miklós Bogáthi Fazekas (4 December 1548, in Torda – 1592 in Kolozsvár) was a Transylvanian Unitarian and Sabbatarian. He had been a teacher in Torda before the 1579 death of Ferenc Dávid. After he associated with the Szekler Sabbatarians who were later persecuted by the Calvinist bishop István Geleji Katona.

References

Szekler Sabbatarians
1548 births
1592 deaths
Hungarian Unitarians
16th-century Hungarian people
People from Turda